In mathematics, the May spectral sequence is a spectral sequence, introduced by . It is used for calculating the initial term of the Adams spectral sequence, which is in turn used for calculating the stable homotopy groups of spheres.

References

 .

Spectral sequences